The Swiftcurrent Ranger Station is an example of the Swiss Chalet style that prevailed in the early years of Glacier National Park, before the establishment of the similar National Park Service Rustic style. The station was designed by Edward A. Nickel and built by Ole Norden and S. M. Askevold. It replaced a previous ranger station, destroyed in a 1936 forest fire. All structures in the district were built within a single year and are consistent in design and materials.

The associated historic district includes five employee cabins in a similar style by the same builders, along with several utility structures.

References

Ranger stations in Glacier National Park (U.S.)
Park buildings and structures on the National Register of Historic Places in Montana
Government buildings completed in 1938
Rustic architecture in Montana
Historic districts on the National Register of Historic Places in Montana
National Register of Historic Places in Flathead County, Montana
National Register of Historic Places in Glacier National Park
1938 establishments in Montana
Swiss Chalet Revival architecture